Christophe Fraser is a professor of Infectious Disease Epidemiology in the Big Data Institute, part of the Nuffield Department of Medicine at the University of Oxford.

Fraser's PhD and initial postdoctoral research were in theoretical particle physics. He converted to infectious disease epidemiology in 1998, based first at the University of Oxford then at Imperial College London, where he became Chair of Theoretical Epidemiology and served as deputy director of the Department of Infectious Disease Epidemiology under director Neil Ferguson (epidemiologist).
He returned to the University of Oxford in 2016 as Senior Group Leader in Pathogen Dynamics at the Big Data Institute.
In 2022 he was appointed Moh Family Foundation Professor of Infectious Disease Epidemiology as part of the University of Oxford's newly created Pandemic Sciences Institute.

Research on HIV 
Fraser and colleagues were among the first to hypothesise that the large variability in virulence observed between individuals living with HIV could be partly due to genetic variation in the virus.
In other words they hypothesised that virulence, considered as a phenotype of the virus, has appreciable heritability.
They and others later provided evidence for this.
Fraser was principal investigator of the BEEHIVE project to investigate the mechanism of this heritability.
He is also principal investigator of the PANGEA 2 project for identifying risk factors for transmission and acquisition of HIV in Sub-Saharan Africa.

Research on the COVID-19 pandemic 
In March 2020 Fraser and his research group published epidemiological modelling supporting 'digital contact tracing' using COVID-19 apps to reduce the spread of SARS-CoV-2. 
Fraser provided advice to the British government and more broadly about implementing such apps.
Fraser's team developed the OpenABM-Covid-19 agent-based model, used by the NHS to model the pandemic, winning the 2021 Analysis in Government award for Innovative methods.

Research on other outbreaks 
Fraser worked on
the 2002–2004 SARS outbreak,
the 2009 swine flu pandemic,
the 2012 MERS outbreak
and the Western African Ebola virus epidemic.

Methodological research 
Fraser's publications include "Factors that make an infectious disease outbreak controllable", 2004, which argued that in addition to the basic reproduction number  a second key parameter of an infectious disease is the proportion of transmission that occurs before the onset of symptoms.
This proportion being large for SARS-CoV-2 was a key difficulty in infection control for the COVID-19 pandemic.
Fraser's 2007 analysis "Estimating Individual and Household Reproduction Numbers in an Emerging Epidemic" defined a novel estimator for the instantaneous (time-varying) reproduction number .

References 

Living people
Academics of the University of Oxford
Academics of Imperial College London
Alumni of the University of Edinburgh
British epidemiologists
Year of birth missing (living people)
Mathematical and theoretical biology
COVID-19 pandemic in England